Acontias bicolor is a species of lizard in the family Scincidae. It is endemic to Zimbabwe.

References

Acontias
Skinks of Africa
Reptiles of Zimbabwe
Endemic fauna of Zimbabwe
Reptiles described in 1929
Taxa named by John Hewitt (herpetologist)